Beefcake is a body shape depicting a large and muscular male body.

Beefcake may also refer to:
 Beefcake magazines, featuring photographs of attractive, muscular young men in athletic poses
 Beefcake (film), a 1999 comedy film

See also
 Beefcake the Mighty, the bassist of the band GWAR
 Brutus Beefcake (Edward Leslie), professional wrestler